The Iowa–Kosovo National Guard Partnership is one of 25 European partnerships that make-up the U.S. European Command State Partnership Program and one of 88 worldwide partnerships that make-up the National Guard State Partnership Program. The partnership was created on March 11, 2011 with the long-term goal of developing the Kosovo Security Force (KSF) and fostering mutually-beneficial interests across all levels of society. Establishing a strong relationship with the government of Kosovo, this partnership represents a critical step toward the reform development of Kosovo's security forces along Euro-Atlantic standards. The relationship lead to a sister state agreement.

History

Kosovo declared its independence from Serbia on Feb. 17, 2008. In its declaration of independence, Kosovo committed to fulfilling its obligations under the plan established by UN Special Envoy Martti Ahtisaari, as a fundamental principle of good governance and to welcome a period of international supervision. United States recognition was immediate and just three years later, Iowa Governor Terry Branstad announced the newly established partnership between the State of Iowa and the Republic of Kosovo. "I am delighted to announce the establishment of a State Partnership Program with the Republic of Kosovo, a great friend to the United States and a place with which our Guardsmen and women are already familiar through service in NATO's Kosovo force," Branstad said. "The State Partnership Program is a longstanding and important program, which will benefit both our Iowa National Guard and the Kosovo Security Force."

Iowa has a special relationship with Kosovo as more than 700 Iowa National Guardsmen and women have been stationed there as part of peacekeeping missions since 2003. Additionally, the Iowa National Guard's public affairs office states that it has been the tradition of Iowa soldiers serving in Kosovo to also engage in nation-building activities on their personal time, such as teaching students English and helping with other types of community betterment projects.

The first major partnership event between Iowa and Kosovo involved the Iowan National Guard's Regional Training Institute spending more than two weeks in Kosovo teaching the first Kosovo Security Force Senior Noncommissioned Officer Course. "This course was in development when the NCO leadership of Iowa visited Kosovo in September," Army CSM Rachel Fails said. "So, it did a couple things for us besides give us, the state partner, information and knowledge of the KSF. It really is the first step in building that relationship – a personal relationship that three years, four years, five years from now we're still going to be here and we're going to keep building here."

In fiscal year 2012, Iowa and Kosovo participated in 9 different SPP events, including a KSF Medical Readiness event, a KSF SR NCO Refresher Course, KSF visit to Iowa, and a Senior Leader Visit to Kosovo.

In September 2012, a particularly important step in furthering the already strong relationship was taken when Iowa sent a military service member to work full-time in Kosovo to help coordinate projects between the two countries.

Partnership focus
2013 Planned Events:
 Ambassador visit to DSM: 14-15 NOV 12
 Company Level Pre Command Seminar: 8-22 DEC 12
 NCO Policy and Strategy Development: 8-15 DEC 12
 Emergency OPS Contingency Planning: FAM – 21-25 JAN 13
 NCO Development Program: 2-9 FEB 13
 Staff NCO Development/Directorate Survey: 2-9 MAR 13
 COMKSF SR Leader Visit: 8-15 APR 13
 Firefighting TCT/FAM: 11-18 APR 13
 TAG IA Visit: 22-29 JUN 13
 Officer/NCO Roles & Responsibilities: 8-22 JUN 13
 Garrison Command: 8-22 JUN 13
 Disaster Management Response Shadow: 10-16 JUL 13
 Utilization of a CSM: 7-14 SEP 13
 Leader Book Development: 14-21 SEP 13

Way Ahead
 Create and Develop an NCO Corps
 Create Domestic Operations
 Improve overall readiness of the Kosovo Security Forces

Discussions of future events include the possible inclusion of Kosovo participants in the Best Warrior competition held each spring in Iowa as well as agricultural exchange and economic ventures.

Establishing a strong relationship with the government of Kosovo, this partnership represents a critical step toward the reform development of Kosovo's security forces along Euro-Atlantic standards.

References

External links

The EUCOM State Partnership page for Iowa-Kosovo
Department of Defense News on the Iowa-Kosovo Partnership
EUCOM SPP
National Guard Bureau SPP
National Guard Bureau SPP News Archives

Kosovo–United States military relations
Military alliances involving the United States
National Guard (United States)